Jump for Joy is a 1941 musical revue by Duke Ellington that opened on July 10, 1941, at the Mayan Theater of Los Angeles and ran for nine weeks (122 performances).

It included many songs by Ellington, including the jazz standard "I Got It Bad (and That Ain't Good)" and the title track, "Jump for Joy."

Reception 

The musical received rave reviews, and both Orson Welles and Charles Chaplin considered buying the show, but were refused, as the show was collaborative in nature and the writers did not want it to be owned.

Despite the original success, "it never made it to Broadway, but it made it to history".

Political message 

Contrary to other all-African-American revues of the time, it was very outspoken on racial matters, with the songs "Jump for Joy" ("Fare thee well, land of cotton / Cotton lisle is out of style"), "Same Old South" ("It's a regular children's heaven / Where they don't start to work until they're seven" and "I got a Passport from Georgia (And I'm Going to The USA)" ("Goodbye Jim / And I do mean Crow").

The production team received protestations and death threats. Duke Ellington described it later in his life as "the first 'social significance' show".

References 

 The Duke Ellington Reader, Mark Tucker, Oxford University Press, 1995, preview available on Google Books.

Revues
1941 musicals
Compositions by Duke Ellington